Robert Christopher Woods (July 3, 1955) was an American football wide receiver. He played for the Houston Oilers in 1978 and for the Detroit Lions in 1979. Woods played college football at Grambling State and was drafted by the Kansas City Chiefs in the fifth round of the 1978 NFL Draft. He is the father of Tennessee Titans wide receiver Robert Woods.

References

1955 births
Living people
American football wide receivers
Grambling State Tigers football players
Houston Oilers players
Detroit Lions players